Saul Mandel (January 21, 1926 – August 14, 2011) was an illustrator, artist, animator and graphic designer in the advertising field. He was most known for designing the Jolly Green Giant, the 1986 Puppy Love postage stamp, and a poster for The Incredible, Edible Egg marketing campaign. 

Mandel's work in advertising had covered many types of products, such as: automobiles, airlines, milk, candy and alcohol. He had worked companies such as, NBC, AT&T, General Motors and Life and a variety of nonprofit groups, such as the Boy Scouts of America and the Advertising Council.

Works

The Jolly Green Giant 

One of Mandel's famous characters, he described this as his favorite project: "I had the most fun with it. Nobody inhibited me in what I did, what I tried to do and how I did it."

"Puppy Love" Stamps 1986 

Created for United States Postal Service, the stamp had been described as 'too cute' for adult to use. Yet its popularity led to the creation of merchandise, which still be purchased at the post office.

Awards of Excellence 
The Society of Illustrators
The New York Art Directors Club
The Chicago Art Directors Club
The Minneapolis Art Directors Club
The New Jersey Art Directors Club
The Philadelphia Art Directors Club
The Connecticut Art Directors Club
The Institute of Outdoor Advertising.
Humor '87, Exhibitions Award
Creativity on Paper, National Exhibitions Award
The Communications Magazine, Exhibitions Award

References

1926 births
2011 deaths
American illustrators
American stamp designers